Pasar Senen Station is a railway station located in Jakarta, Indonesia. It is the second largest railway station in Jakarta after Gambir Station. It is located close to Pasar Senen market area in Senen, Senen, Central Jakarta.

Pasar Senen only serves Economy and Business class intercity train except Gumarang and Sawunggalih. It also serves as a station for northbound KRL Commuterline trains.

History
The name of this train station comes from a market with the same name. It is called Pasar Senen because this market is only open on Mondays; founded by the Colonial Government in 1733 to revive the economy of the Weltevreden people who later became Gambir, Central Jakarta.

During the leadership of Governor General Petrus Albertus van der Parra, Pasar Senen was getting busier so that it was open every day. Many Chinese traders opened their businesses in this market. Since independence until 1975, Pasar Senen has continued to be developed as a center for Senen trading and has become the backbone of Jakarta's economy at that time.

First generation (1887–1925) 
The development of Pasar Senen requires adequate transportation facilities, especially trains. This station was opened by the Bataviasche Oosterspoorweg Maatschappij (BOS) on 31 March 1887 as a small stop. The opening of this station coincided with the opening of the Batavia-Bekasi railway line. The line was then bought by Staatsspoorwegen (SS) in 1898 because of BOS' debt which was swelling.

In 1904, De Ingenieur magazine mentioned that this station had undergone renovations (possibly changing the building to become permanent). This development is also part of the construction of the Kemayoran Station, which both cost ƒ350,000.00.

Second generation (1925–now) 

As passenger traffic increased, Pasar Senen Station was rebuilt with a fairly large face.  Because it was affected by the construction of the new station, the old Pasar Senen Station had to be torn down. The station opened on 19 March 1925 after eight years of construction. Having the layout of an island station, this station is equipped with two underground tunnels. There are two tunnels, one for departing passengers and one for exiting the station.

This rebuilding was carried out to welcome the operation of the SS's new service, the electric multiple unit and to commemorate the 50th anniversary of the SS on April 6, 1925. SS presented a number of magnificent train stations in Batavia which were expected to provide passenger satisfaction.

Currently the station building has the status of a cultural heritage by the Central Unit for Preservation and Architectural Design of PT KAI, the Ministry of Culture and Tourism, and the Provincial Government of DKI Jakarta. Determination of cultural heritage status is based on the Decree of the Minister of Culture and Tourism No: PM.13/PW.007/MKP/05 and Decree of the Governor of DKI Jakarta No. 475 of 1993.

Building layout 
The station has six railway lines with lines 3 and 4 being straight tracks.  This building was designed by J. van Gendt, with a Neo-Indische architectural style. Its vernacular character is very prominent, it can be seen from the dominating pyramid roof with eaves added above the entrance hall to protect the building from rainwater seepage, and when viewed from the outside it looks like a two-story building. The doors are in Romanesque style with exposed roof consoles.

This station became popular because it was always visited by travelers who wanted to use rail services to various destinations on the island of Java. In order to make passenger arrangements more comfortable, the Jakarta Operational Area I provides separate doors according to the type of train, namely for long-distance trains and for Commuter Line KRL. In addition, there is also an underground tunnel that connects the platform lines 1 to 3 and lines 4 to 6.

Transportation integration and Tekad Merdeka Monument 

The front of Pasar Senen Station has undergone a complete overhaul and was inaugurated by Minister of State-Owned Enterprises Erick Thohir, Minister of Transportation Budi Karya Sumadi, and the Governor of Jakarta Anies Baswedan on June 17, 2020. This renovation program is a collaborative project of KAI, the government of Jakarta, and the Jakarta MRT. The 1,427.5 m² land in front of the station is made into a plaza with pedestrian and disabled access and is integrated with the Senen and Central Senen TransJakarta BRT Stations as well as online and auto-rickshaw pick-up points. In order to create a healthy area, the plaza also has a shade canopy, green open space and bicycle parking racks.

The monument in front of the station, namely the "Tekad Merdeka Monument" or "Monumen Perjuangan Senen", has also been raised. This monument to commemorate the bloodshed against the Allied forces in the area of ​​Senen 29 September 1945 was inaugurated on 2 May 1982 by the Mayor of Central Jakarta, A. Munir. This monument was made with cement stone lathe cast concrete construction and was imported from Sleman Regency, Yogyakarta.

Services
The station serves both KRL Commuterline and long-distance train. 34 long-distance trains depart from Pasar Senen station daily.

Mixed Class 
 Gumarang, from and to Surabaya Pasar Turi via Semarang Tawang (executive and business class)
 Sawunggalih, from and to Kutoarjo via Purwokerto (executive and economy premium class)
 Singasari, from and to Blitar via Purwokerto (executive and economy class)
 Fajar/Senja Utama Solo, from and to Solo Balapan via Purwokerto (executive and economy premium class)
 Fajar Utama YK, from and to Yogyakarta via Purwokerto (executive and economy premium class)
 Senja Utama YK, from and to Yogyakarta via Purwokerto (executive and economy premium class)
 Bogowonto, from and to Lempuyangan via Purwokerto (executive and economy plus class)
 Gajah Wong, from and to Lempuyangan via Purwokerto (executive and business class)
 Jayabaya, from and to Malang via Surabaya Pasar Turi (executive and economy plus class)
 Mataram, from and to Solo Balapan via Purwokerto (executive and business class)
 Gaya Baru Malam Selatan, from and to Surabaya Gubeng (executive and economy plus class)
 Bangunkarta, from and to Jombang (executive and economy plus class)
 Dharmawangsa, from and to Surabaya Pasar Turi (executive and economy class)
 Brantas, from and to Blitar via Semarang Poncol (executive and economy class)
 Kutojaya Utara Fakultatif, from and to Kutoarjo (business and economy class)
 Kertajaya Tambahan, from and to Surabaya Pasar Turi (business and economy class)
 Brantas Tambahan, from and to Blitar via Semarang (business and economy class)

Note: * Brantas Tambahan & Kertajaya Tambahan only operates during high season e.g. new year, eid al fitr* Kutojaya Utara Fakultatif only operates during weekends & high season e.g. new year, eid al fitr

Premium Economy Class 
 Jayakarta, from and to Surabaya Gubeng via Yogyakarta
 Tawang Jaya Premium, from and to Semarang Tawang
 Kutojaya Utara, to Kutoarjo and

Economy Plus Class 
 Majapahit, from and to Malang via Semarang-Madiun-Blitar
 Jaka Tingkir, from and to Lempuyangan
 Menoreh, to Semarang Tawang and

Economy Class 
 Matarmaja, (reguler and tambahan), from and to Malang via Semarang-Solo-Madiun-Blitar
 Bengawan, from and to Purwosari
 Progo, from and to Lempuyangan via Purwokerto
 Tawang Jaya, from and to Semarang Poncol
 Serayu, from and to  via -

KAI Commuter 

  Cikarang Loop Line (Full Racket)

Supporting transportation

References

Cited works

External links

 PT KAI - the Indonesian rail company 

Central Jakarta
Railway stations in Jakarta
Railway stations opened in 1925
Colonial architecture in Jakarta